is a passenger railway station located in the town of Shimanto, Takaoka District, Kōchi, Japan. It is operated by Shikoku Railway Company (JR Shikoku). The station bears the number "G30".

Lines

Layout
The station building is built of timber in the style of a mountain lodge. There is a ticket window, waiting area and a shop. A tunnel and a flight of steps lead from the station to an island platform serving two tracks. Parking is available on a paved compound beside the track. A bus company maintains an office in the station premises and there is a bus depot next to the building.

History
The station opened on 1 March 1974 under the control of Japanese National Railways. After the privatization of JNR on 1 April 1987, control of the station passed to JR Shikoku.

Surrounding area
The station is located in the centre of the former town of Taishō which was merged into the town of Shimanto in 2006.
Shimanto River - runs next to Taisho near the station.
National Route 381 - runs through Taisho between the station and the river.
Old Takeuchi Family Residence - half a kilometer from the station. It is an example of a traditional mountain village farmhouse of thatch and timber construction which has been listed as an Important Cultural Property.
Mutemuka Brewery (無手無冠) - a sake brewery which also produces a shōchū made from chestnuts.
Todoroki Park (轟公園) - a local recreation area with a windmill made of stone.
River Park Todoroki (轟公園) - a campsite by the Shimanto River.
Shimanto Taishō Road Station - a service station along National Route 381.

See also
 List of railway stations in Japan

References

External links
Station timetable

Railway stations in Kōchi Prefecture
Yodo Line
Railway stations in Japan opened in 1974
Shimanto, Kōchi (town)